George W. Drum (October 3, 1925–December 16, 1997) was an early leader in automobile club circles, and the first director of the Crosley Car Owners Club in 1952. With Edward Herzog, he worked to preserve the stock of spare parts for Crosley automobiles and trucks when the parent company Crosley Motors, Incorporated was sold to General Tire in July 1952 and production halted on July 3 of that year. George W. Drum resided at 2101 Greenway Avenue in Charlotte, North Carolina.

People in the automobile industry
1925 births
1997 deaths